King of Ear ( Shahgoosh) is an Iranian drama and comedy. The series is directed by Davood Mir-Bagheri.

Storyline 
A man who can not replace his love for Esteghlal with anything else, He has a daughter whose suitor is a supporter of Persepolis and it is this color belonging that causes him to oppose. An accident leads to his death and the reopening of a murder case, The only witness is a man with one eye who has only recognized the color and type of car! This is how the story begins...

Awards 
Yas Zarrin (Golden Jasmine) Best Actor for Mohsen Tanabandeh at the 4th Yas International Film Festival and receive the Hafez Award for Best Actor.

Cast 
 Farhad Aslani
 Mohsen Tanabandeh
 Alireza Jafari
 Tannaz Tabatabaei
 Marjaneh Golchin
 Hamid Reza Azarang
 Ahmad Mehranfar
 Hadi Kazemi
 Hanieh Tavassoli
 Reza Rooygari
 Rasoul Najafian
 Reza Kianian
 Amin Zendegani
 Akbar Abdi
 Hossein Soleimani
 Shahram Haghighat Doost
 Hamed Mir Bagheri
 Elham Pavehnejad
 Mehrdad Sedighian
 Sirus Gorjestani
 Shabnam Farshadjoo
 Farideh Sepah Mansour
 Ardeshir Kazemi

References

External links
 

2010s Iranian television series
Iranian television series
Video rental services